The chief justice of Afghanistan is the head of Afghanistan's supreme court. There have been multiple supreme courts throughout Afghanistan's history. The current supreme court is the Supreme Court of the Islamic Emirate of Afghanistan, and its current chief justice is Abdul Hakim Ishaqzai.

List of chief justices

Supreme Court of the Islamic Emirate of Afghanistan (1996-2001) 
 Noor Mohammad Saqib

Supreme Court of the Islamic Republic of Afghanistan (2001-2021) 
 Faisal Ahmad Shinwari (December 2001 – May 2006), was a member of the Islamic Dawah Organisation of Afghanistan
 Abdul Salam Azimi (May 2006 – October 2014), a former professor at the University of Arizona in the United States
 Sayed Yousuf Halim (October 2014 – August 2021), former Deputy Minister of Justice for Technical Affairs (and Acting Minister of Justice), Deputy Minister for Administrative Affairs, and Head of the Ministry of Justice's General Legislative Department

Supreme Court of the Islamic Emirate of Afghanistan (2021-present) 

 Abdul Hakim Ishaqzai (August 2021 – present)

References

Afghanistan
Afghan judges
Judiciary of Afghanistan
Qadis

Law enforcement in the Islamic Republic of Afghanistan